
 
Gopal Singh Nepali (11 August 1911 – 17 April 1963) was an Indian poet of Hindi literature and a lyricist of Bollywood. He was the son of Rel Bahadur Singh and Saraswoti. He was born on birthday of Lord Krishna (Krishna Janmashtami). His association with Bollywood spanned around two decades, beginning in 1944 and ended with his death in 1963.

He was a poet of post-Chhayavaad period, and he wrote several collections of Hindi poems including "Umang" (published in 1933). The names of famous poetry collections such as Umang, Ragini, panchhi, Neelima, Himalaya ne Pukara etc. are notable in their important works. He also wrote collections of Nepali poem as 'Kalpana'. He was also a journalist and edited at least four Hindi magazines, namely, Ratlam Times, Chitrapat, Sudha, and Yogi.

He was very respected along with his contemporaries Mahadevi Verma, Sumitranandan Pant, Suryakant Tripathi, Ramdhari Sigh Dinkar etc. His works have been included in course of different universities of India. He was born in Bettiah in the state of Bihar. 
During Sino-Indian War of 1962, he wrote many patriotic songs and poems which include Savan. He died on 17 April 1963 in Bhagalpur platform no. 2.

See also
 Controversial issues surrounding Slumdog Millionaire#Gopal Singh Nepali

Further reading
 Tikaram Upadhyaya. Gopal Singh Nepali (Nepali and Hindi poet), Sahitya Akademi,

References

External links
 Poet Gopal Singh Nepali devoted to the nation. Deshbandhu.
 Gopal Singh Nepali. anubhuti-hindi.org
 Popular national poet. Jagran.
 Gopal Singh Nepali. kavitakosh.org.
 Songs of Gopal Singh Nepali as a lyricist. Smriti.com.
 Remembering Poet Gopal Singh Nepali. : Bhaskar.

Hindi-language poets
Poets from Bihar
1911 births
1963 deaths
20th-century Indian poets
Indian male poets
20th-century Indian male writers
Indian lyricists